Rogers Gaines (born June 24, 1989) is a former American football offensive tackle. He played college football at Tennessee State.

Early years
He is the son of Rogers and Laurita Gaines.

He attended White House High School (Sumner County) in White House, TN. He was selected to the All-Region and All-State teams while he was at high school.

Gaines was a two-year starter at defensive tackle and then switched to offense at left tackle for his senior season for the Blue Devils, grading out at 85 percent blocking with 80 pancake blocks and no sacks allowed in 133 attempts. The Blue Devils had two 1,000-yard rushers and a 1,000-yard passer behind Gaines, and he was rewarded for his efforts as a top-three finalist for the Tennessee Titans Mr. Football Awards in Class 3-A for Lineman. The winner of the award in his category was future Alabama and National Football League standout Don't'a Hightower of Marshall County.

The Blue Devils were the Region 4-3A co-champions in 2007 and finished 9-4 with a trip to the state quarterfinals in Class 3-A. For his career on defense, he had 92 tackles including 13 for losses, one forced fumble and five sacks. He participated in the 2006 Elite Football Combine as one of the top 60 players in the state of Tennessee.

For his achievements, as a senior, he was named the Region 4-3A Offensive Lineman of the Year, and a member of The All-Midstate Team (The Tennessean), The All-County Team (The News Examiner) and the All-State teams for the Tennessee Football Coaches Association and the Tennessee Sports Writers Association.

The 6-foot-7, 332-pound lineman was also an All-State basketball player for the Blue Devils.

College career
He was selected to the 2011 All-OVC Second-team. He also was selected to the 2012 Preseason Phil Steele Second-team All-American team.

As a senior, he was First-team Ohio Valley Conference. Gaines was named to the HBCU Huddle/College Sporting News All-American Team for 2012, his senior season. Gaines was a part of a TSU offensive line that led the Ohio Valley Conference in rushing at 175.7 yards per game. The senior did not give up a sack all season and graded out at a 93.6. Gaines was also named to the BOXTOROW All-American Team and The Sports Network FCS and Associated Press All-American Team.

Professional career

2013 NFL Combine 

Gaines graded out at 60.9 and was a late-round NFL draft projection, but was not selected in the NFL draft and signed as an undrafted free agent.

Baltimore Ravens
On May 3, 2013, he signed with the Baltimore Ravens as an undrafted free agent.

Chicago Bears
On September 24, 2013, he was signed to the Chicago Bears' practice squad.

New York Giants
On May 31, 2014, he was signed to the New York Giants.

BC Lions 
On April 12, 2016, Gaines signed with the BC Lions of the Canadian Football League. He was released by the team on June 12, 2016.

References

External links
Tennessee State bio
Baltimore Ravens bio

Further reading

1989 births
Living people
Baltimore Ravens players
Chicago Bears players
New York Giants players
BC Lions players
American football offensive tackles
Canadian football offensive linemen
American players of Canadian football
Players of American football from Tennessee
People from Goodlettsville, Tennessee